Precis ceryne, the marsh commodore, is a species of butterfly in the family Nymphalidae, native to Subsaharan Africa.

Wingspan: 40–45 mm in males and 42–50 mm in females.

Subspecies
P. c. ceryne – Republic of the Congo, Central African Republic, Angola, Democratic Republic of the Congo, Uganda, Rwanda, Burundi, Ethiopia, Kenya, Tanzania, Zambia, Mozambique, Zimbabwe, Botswana, South Africa, Eswatini
P. c. ceruana Rothschild & Jordan, 1903 – Guinea, Burkina Faso, Ivory Coast, Ghana, Benin, Nigeria, Cameroon

Diet
Larval food plants include Coleus, Plastostema, and Pycnostachys species.

References

Junoniini
Butterflies of Africa
Butterflies described in 1847